Hugh Jones may refer to:

Hugh Jones (bishop) (1508–1574), bishop of Llandaff
Hugh Jones (priest) (c. 1816–1897), British religious leader
Hugh Jones (archdeacon of Essex) (1783–1869), Welsh churchman
Hugh Jones (runner) (born 1955), British runner
Hugh Jones (comics), fictional character
Hugh Jones (cricketer) (1889–1918), English cricketer
Hugh Jones (producer), British record producer
Hugh Jones (professor) (1691–1760), College of William and Mary professor, Maryland clergyman
Hugh Jones (tennis) (1880–1960), American Olympic tennis player
Hugh Jones (footballer) (1876–?), Welsh footballer
Hugh Jones (weightlifter) (1930–1965), New Zealand Olympic weightlifter
Hugh Bolton Jones (1848–1927), American painter
Hugh M. Jones (1892–1978), Wisconsin state senator
Hugh R. Jones (1914–2001), New York judge
Hugh Jones (politician) (born 1966), Australian politician
Wynn Hugh-Jones (1923–2019), British diplomat and Liberal Party official, sometimes erroneously referred to as Sir Hugh Jones
Hugh Eyton-Jones (1863–1943), British clergyman

See also
Hugh Lloyd-Jones (1922–2009), British classical scholar and Regius Professor of Greek at Oxford University
Hugo Jones (1904–1970), British historian of classical antiquity